A list of films produced in Egypt in 1964. For an A-Z list of films currently on Wikipedia, see :Category:Egyptian films.

External links
 Egyptian films of 1964 at the Internet Movie Database
 Egyptian films of 1964 elCinema.com

Lists of Egyptian films by year
1964 in Egypt
Lists of 1964 films by country or language